Norcross Brothers Contractors and Builders was a nineteenth-century American construction company, especially noted for their work, mostly in stone, for the architectural firms of H.H. Richardson and McKim, Mead & White. The company was founded by James Atkinson and Orlando Whitney, who were contracted for their first project in 1869. In all, the company is credited with completing over 650 building projects.

History 
The Norcross brothers, James Atkinson (b. 24 March 1831) and Orlando Whitney (b. 26 October 1839), were born in Maine to Jesse Springer Norcross, proprietor of Norcross Mills and Margaret Ann [Whitney] and moved to Worcester, Massachusetts in 1868. Their pedigree descends from Philip Norcross and his wife, Sarah [Jackson], the brothers' paternal great - great grandparents, originally of Watertown, MA. Skilled construction carpenters, they opened their own construction company and in 1869 contracted to build the new Worcester high school building designed by a young architect, H.H. Richardson.  From that point on the brothers became Richardson's primary contractors; ultimately, they were to build more than thirty of his designs, including three that are considered his best work, Trinity Church in Boston, Massachusetts, the Marshall Fields & Company building in Chicago, Illinois and the Allegheny County Courthouse in Pittsburgh, Pennsylvania. 

Following the death of Richardson, the brothers became the contractor for many of McKim, Mead & White's projects.  When MM&W opened a new office in New York City, in 1894, the Norcross Brothers had their own space within it. As had been the case with Richardson, much of the value of the Norcross Brothers to MM&W, and other architects derived from Orlando Norcross's engineering skill.  Though largely self-taught, he had developed the skills needed to solve the vast engineering problems brought to him by his clients. For example, the size of the dome at the Rhode Island Capitol was expanded very late in the design process, perhaps even after construction had begun, so that it would be larger than the one just completed by Cass Gilbert for the Minnesota Capitol.

Because of their need for stone, a primary building material of the time, was outpacing the supply the brothers eventually acquired their own stone quarries, first in Connecticut (Branford) (now on the National Register of Historic Places) and in Massachusetts, and later in Westchester County, New York and in Georgia.  They also established a factory in Worcester where they manufactured architectural building parts

Selected H.H. Richardson projects
 Ames Monument, Laramie, Wyoming,  Augustus Saint-Gaudens, sculptor, 1882
 William Watts Sherman House, Newport, RI, 1875 - 1876.

Projects for other architects
Juniper Hall, later Masonic Hospital,  Shrewsbury, Massachusetts, James Earle, architect
Art Institute of Chicago, Shepley, Rutan and Coolidge, Chicago, Illinois,  1892
Cathedral of All Saints, Albany, New York, Robert Gibson, Architect, begun 1884
Congregational Library & Archives, Shepley, Rutan, and Coolidge, Boston, Massachusetts, 1889
The Algonquin Club, Boston, McKim, Mead and White, architects, 1886
Adams Memorial, McKim, Mead and White, architects, Augustus Saint-Gaudens, sculptor,  Rock Creek Cemetery, Washington D.C., 1891
Millicent Library, Brigham & Spofford architects, Fairhaven, Massachusetts, 1893, as well as numerous other public libraries, mostly in the north eastern part of the United States. 
Crouse Memorial College, Syracuse, New York, Archimedes Russell, architect, 1897
 South Station, Boston, Massachusetts with Shepley, Rutan and Coolidge, 1897
Worcester City Hall, Worcester, Massachusetts, Peabody and Stearns, architects, 1895–1898
University Club of New York, McKim, Mead and White, architects, 1899
Symphony Hall, Boston, Massachusetts, McKim, Mead and White, architects, 1900
Jersey City Public Library, Jersey City, New Jersey, Brite & Bacon, architects, 1901
Low Library, Columbia University, New York City, McKim, Mead and White, architects, 
Norcross Mausoleum,  Hope Cemetery, Worcester, Massachusetts, 1903
Corcoran Art Gallery, Washington D.C.
Leicester Congregational Church
Leicester Public Library, Stephen Earle, architect, 1895-1896
Harvard Medical Building, Shepley, Rutan and Coolidge, Architects, 1906
Rhode Island State Capitol Building,  McKim, Mead and White, architects, 1895–1904
New York Public Library Main Branch, Carrere and Hastings, architects, 1911
Gates for Hope Cemetery, Worcester, Massachusetts, 1915
Gatehouses and Pavilion, Vanderbilt Mansion, McKim, Mead and White, architects, Hyde Park, New York, 1896–1898

Citations

References
 Baker, Paul R., Stanny: The Gilded Life of Stanford White, The Free Press, New York,  1989
 Ochsner, Jeffrey Karl, H.H. Richardson:Complete Architectural Works, MIT Press, Cambridge, Massachusetts,  1984
 Roth, Leland M.,  McKim, Mead & White, Architects, Harper & Row Publishers, New York, NY  1983

External links 
http://college.holycross.edu/projects/worcester/institutions/norcross.htm
http://norcross.ca

Construction and civil engineering companies of the United States
Defunct companies based in Maine